Tony Middleton may refer to:

Tony Middleton (cricketer) (born 1964), former English cricketer
Tony Middleton (singer) (born 1934), American singer

See also
Anthony Middleton (died 1590), English Roman Catholic priest and martyr